The 2001 Euroleague Finals was the final playoffs for the title of the 2000–01 Euroleague.

After five games, Kinder Bologna achieved its second title against TAU Cerámica. Argentine Manu Ginóbili was named MVP of the Finals.

Results

Game 1

Game 2

Game 3

Game 4

Game 5

Awards

Euroleague Finals MVP 
  Manu Ginóbili ( Kinder Bologna)

Euroleague Finals Top Scorer 
 (15.4 points per game):
  Manu Ginóbili ( Kinder Bologna)
  Elmer Bennett ( TAU Cerámica)
  Victor Alexander ( TAU Cerámica)

External links 
 2001 EuroLeague Finals at EuroLeague
 2001 EuroLeague Finals at Linguasport

2000-01 
International basketball competitions hosted by Italy
International basketball competitions hosted by Spain
Sport in Bologna
2000–01 in Italian basketball
2000–01 in Spanish basketball
Finals